This article contains a list of fossil-bearing stratigraphic units in the state of South Dakota, U.S.

Sites

See also

 Paleontology in South Dakota

References

 

South Dakota
Stratigraphic units
Stratigraphy of South Dakota
South Dakota geography-related lists
United States geology-related lists